Tyrrhenians (Attic Greek:  Turrhēnoi) or Tyrsenians (Ionic:  Tursēnoi; Doric:  Tursānoi) was the name used by the ancient Greeks authors to refer, in a generic sense, to non-Greek people, in particular pirates.

While ancient sources have been interpreted in a variety of ways, the Greeks called always the Etruscans Tyrsenoi, although not all Tyrsenians were Etruscans.  Furthermore the languages of Etruscan, Rhaetian and Lemnian cultures have been grouped together as the Tyrsenian languages, based on their strong similarities.

Earliest references
The names are believed to be exonyms, only known to have been used by authors of Ancient Greek, though their origin is uncertain and apparently not Greek. They have been connected to τύρσις (túrsis), also a "Mediterranean" loan into Greek, meaning "tower". Direct connections with Tuscī, the Latin exonym for the Etruscans, from *Turs-ci, have also been attempted. The French linguist Françoise Bader has alternatively hypothesized that Tyrsenoi/Tyrrhenoi derives from the Proto-Indo-European root *trh₂- meaning "to cross", but this is unlikely given the variations and unclear derivation.

The first Greek author to mention the Tyrrhenians is the 8th-century BC Greek poet Hesiod, in his work, the Theogony. He merely described them as residing in central Italy alongside the Latins.

The Homeric hymn to Dionysus has Tyrsenian pirates seizing Dionysus:

After Herodotus' Histories a party of Lydians, wretched by a persistent famine, decided to migrate. Led by Tyrsenos, son of Atys, king of Lydia, they sailed to the west coast of central Italy where they settled in the region of the Umbri.

Late references
The Tyrrhenians are referred to as pirates by Ephorus of Cyme as reported by Strabo. The pirating actions of the Tyrrhenians would not have allowed the Greeks to found their colonies in Sicily before the 8th century BC.

In the 6th and 5th centuries BC, the name referred specifically to the Etruscans for whom the Tyrrhenian Sea is named, according to Strabo.  In Pindar, the Tyrsenoi appear allied with the Carthaginians as a threat to Magna Graecia:

The name is also attested in a fragment by Sophocles.

The name becomes increasingly associated with the generic Pelasgians. Herodotus places them in Crestonia in Thrace, as neighbours of the Pelasgians. Similarly, Thucydides mentions them together with the Pelasgians and associates them with Lemnian pirates and with the pre-Greek population of Attica.

Lemnos remained relatively free of Greek influence until Hellenistic times, and the Lemnos stele of the 6th century BC was inscribed with a language very similar to Etruscan, which has led to the postulation of a Tyrrhenian language family of Etruscan, Lemnian and Raetic.

There is thus evidence that there was indeed at least a linguistic relationship between the Lemnians and the Etruscans. The circumstances of this are disputed; most scholars would ascribe Aegean Tyrrhenians to the Etruscan expansion from the 8th to the 6th centuries, putting the homeland of the Etruscans in Italy and the Alps, particularly because of their relation to the Alpine Rhaetian population. Another hypothesis connecting the Tyrrhenians and the Etruscans posits that the Etruscans derive at least partially from a 12th century BC invasion from the Aegean and Anatolia imposing itself over the Villanovan culture, with some scholars claiming a relationship or at least evidence of close contact between the Anatolian languages and the Etruscan language and adherents of the latter school of thought point to the legend of Lydian origin of the Etruscans referred to by Herodotus and Livy's statement that the Rhaetians were Etruscans driven into the mountains by the invading Gauls. Critics of the theory point to the very scanty evidence of a linguistic relationship of Etruscan with Anatolian and to Dionysius of Halicarnassus, who decidedly argues against an Etruscan-Lydian relationship. Furthermore, there is no archaeological evidence from material culture of such a cultural shift and of an eastern origins of the Etruscans, in modern times, all the evidence gathered so far by etruscologists points to an indigenous origin of the Etruscans. Just as the archaeological evidence is against the idea that the Rhaetians are descended from the Etruscans who fled from northern Italy because of the Gallic invasions, as the Rhaetians are archaeologically attested in their Alpine sites long before.

Possible connection with Sea Peoples
It has been hypothesised that the Teresh, who appear among other Sea Peoples in a number of Ancient Egyptian inscriptions from 1200 to 1150 BC, may be the same people as the Tyrsenians.

See also
Etruscans

Footnotes

References

 

Pre-Indo-Europeans
Etruscans
Tribes in Greco-Roman historiography
Villanovan culture